Farrokhabad-e Olya may refer to:

Farrokhabad-e Olya, Delfan
Farrokhabad-e Olya, Kuhdasht